Giovanni Tabacchi (8 July 1931 – 2 September 2018) was an Italian bobsledder who competed in the late 1950s. He finished fifth in the four-man event at the 1956 Winter Olympics in Cortina d'Ampezzo. He was born in Belluno.

Tabacchi died on 2 September 2018 in Florence, aged 87.

References
1956 bobsleigh four-man results
Wallechinsky, David (1984). "Bobsled: Four-man". In The Complete Book of the Olympics: 1896 - 1980. New York: Penguin Books. p. 561.

External links
 

1931 births
2018 deaths
Bobsledders at the 1956 Winter Olympics
Italian male bobsledders
Olympic bobsledders of Italy
People from Belluno